Classification of Indigenous peoples of the Americas is based upon cultural regions, geography, and linguistics. Anthropologists have named various cultural regions, with fluid boundaries, that are generally agreed upon with some variation. These cultural regions are broadly based upon the locations of Indigenous peoples of the Americas from early European and African contact beginning in the late 15th century. When Indigenous peoples have been forcibly removed by nation-states, they retain their original geographic classification. Some groups span multiple cultural regions.

Canada, Greenland, United States, and northern Mexico 
In the United States and Canada, ethnographers commonly classify Indigenous peoples into ten geographical regions with shared cultural traits, called cultural areas. Greenland is part of the Arctic region. Some scholars combine the Plateau and Great Basin regions into the Intermontane West, some separate Prairie peoples from Great Plains peoples, while some separate Great Lakes tribes from the Northeastern Woodlands.

Arctic 

 Paleo-Eskimo, prehistoric cultures, Russia, Alaska, Canada, Greenland, 2500 BCE–1500 CE
 Arctic small tool tradition, prehistoric culture, 2500 BCE, Bering Strait
 Pre-Dorset, eastern Arctic, 2500–500 BCE
 Saqqaq culture, Greenland, 2500–800 BCE
 Independence I, northeastern Canada and Greenland, 2400–1800 BCE
 Independence II culture, northeastern Canada and Greenland, 800–1 BCE)
 Groswater, Labrador and Nunavik, Canada
 Dorset culture, 500 BCE–1500 CE, Alaska, Canada
 Aleut (Unangan), Aleutian Islands of Alaska, and Kamchatka Krai, Russia
 Inuit, Russia, Alaska, Canada, Greenland
 Thule, proto-Inuit, Alaska, Canada, Greenland, 900–1500 CE
 Birnirk culture, prehistoric Inuit culture, Alaska, 500 CE–900 CE
 Greenlandic Inuit, Greenland
 Kalaallit, west Greenland
 Avanersuarmiut (Inughuit), north Greenland
 Tunumiit, east Greenland
 Inuvialuit, western Canadian Arctic
 Iñupiat, north and northwest Alaska
 Yupik peoples (Yup'ik), Alaska and Russia
 Alutiiq (Sugpiaq, Pacific Yupik), Alaska Peninsula, coastal and island areas of south central Alaska
 Central Alaskan Yup'ik people, west central Alaska
 Cup'ik, Hooper Bay and Chevak, Alaska
 Nunivak Cup'ig people (Cup'ig), Nunivak Island, Alaska
 Siberian Yupik, Russian Far East and St. Lawrence Island, Alaska
 Chaplino
 Naukan
 Sirenik, Siberia

Subarctic 

 Ahtna (Ahtena, Nabesna)
 Anishinaabe – see also Northeastern Woodlands
 Oji-Cree (Anishinini, Severn Ojibwa) Ontario, Manitoba
 Ojibwa (Chippewa, Ojibwe) Ontario, Manitoba, Minnesota
 Atikamekw, Quebec
 Chipewyan, Alaskan interior, Western Canada
 Cree, Central and Eastern Canada, North Dakota
 Dakelh (Carrier), British Columbia
 Babine, British Columbia
 Wet'suwet'en, British Columbia
 Deg Hit’an (Deg Xinag, Degexit’an, Kaiyuhkhotana), Alaska
 Dena’ina (Tanaina), Alaska
 Dane-zaa (Beaver, Dunneza), Alberta, British Columbia
 Gwich'in (Kutchin, Loucheaux), Alaska, Yukon
 Hän, Alaska, Yukon
 Holikachuk, Alaska
 Innu (Montagnais), Labrador, Quebec
 Kaska (Nahane)
 Kolchan (Upper Kuskokwim)
 Koyukon, Alaska
 Naskapi
 Sekani
 Sahtú (North Slavey, Bearlake, Hare, Mountain), Northwest Territories
 Slavey (Awokanak, Slave, Deh Gah Got'ine, Deh Cho), Alberta, British Columbia
 Tagish
 Tahltan
 Lower Tanana
 Middle Tanana
 Upper Tanana
 Tanacross
 Tasttine (Beaver)
 Tli Cho
 Inland Tlingit
 Tsetsaut (extinct)
 Tsilhqot'in (Chilcotin)
 Northern Tutchone
 Southern Tutchone
 Yellowknives

Pacific Northwest coast 

 Alsea, Oregon
 Heiltsuk
 Nuxalk
 Tsleil-Waututh First Nation
 Chehalis (Upper and Lower), Washington
 Chehalis (BC), Fraser Valley
 Chemakum, Washington (extinct)
 Chetco – see Tolowa
 Chinook Dialects: (Lower Chinook, Upper Chinook, Clackamas, Wasco)
 Clallam – see Klallam
 Clatsop
 Comox, Vancouver Island/BC Georgia Strait
 Coos, Hanis, Oregon
 Lower Coquille (Miluk), Oregon
 Upper Coquille
 Cowichan, Southern Vancouver Island and Georgia Strait
 Quwutsun
 Somena
 Quamichan
 Lower Cowlitz, Washington
 Duwamish, Washington
 Eyak, Alaska
 Galice
 Gitxsan, British Columbia
 Haida (Dialects: Kaigani, Skidegate, Masset), BC & Alaska
 Haisla BC North/Central Coast
 Haihai
 Kimsquit
 Kitimaat
 Heiltsuk BC Central Coast
 Hoh Washington
 Kalapuya (Calapooia, Calapuya, Tfalatim, Yamel, Yaquina, Yoncalla), Oregon
 Central Kalapuya, Oregon
 Ahantchuyuk
 Mary's River
 Lakmiut
 Mohawk, Oregon
 Santiam
 North Kalapuya, Oregon
 Tfalati (Atfalati)
 Tualatin
 Yamhill (Yamel)
 South Kalapuya (Yonkalla, Yoncalla), Oregon
 Klallam (Clallam, Dialects: Klallam (Lower Elwha), S'Klallam (Jamestown), S'Klallam (Port Gamble))
 Klickitat
 Kwalhioqua
 Kwakwaka'wakw, British Columbia
 Koskimo
 'Namgis
 Laich-kwil-tach (Euclataws or Yuculta)
 Lummi, Washington
 Makah, Washington
 Muckleshoot, Washington
 Musqueam, BC Lower Mainland (Vancouver)
 Nisga'a, British Columbia
 Nisqually, Washington
 Nooksack, Washington
 Nuu-chah-nulth West Coast of Vancouver Island
 Nuxalk (Bella Coola) – BC Central Coast
 Oowekeno – see Wuikinuxv
 Pentlatch, Vancouver Island and Georgia Strait (extinct)
 Puyallup, Washington
 Quileute, Washington
 Quinault, Washington
 Rivers Inlet – see Wuikinuxv
 Rogue River or Upper Illinois (Chasta Costa), Oregon, California
 Saanich Southern Vancouver Island/Georgia Strait
 Samish, Washington
 Sauk-Suiattle, Washington
 Sechelt, BC Sunshine Coast/Georgia Strait (Shishalh)
 Shoalwater Bay Tribe, Washington
 Siletz, Oregon
 Siuslaw, Oregon
 Skagit
 Skokomish, Washington
 Sliammon, BC Sunshine Coast/Georgia Strait (Mainland Comox)
 Snohomish
 Snoqualmie
 Snuneymuxw (Nanaimo), Vancouver Island
 Songhees (Songish), Southern Vancouver Island/Strait of Juan de Fuca
 Sooke, Southern Vancouver Island/Strait of Juan de Fuca
 Squamish (Skwxwu7mesh), British Columbia
 Squaxin Island Tribe Washington
 Spokane Washington
 Stillaguamish Washington
 Sto:lo, BC Lower Mainland/Fraser Valley
 Kwantlen
 Katzie
 Steilacoom, Coast Salish, Puget Sound, Washington (extinct)
 Suquamish, Washington
 Swinomish, Washington
 Tait
 Takelma Oregon
 Talio
 Tillamook (Nehalem) Oregon
 Tlatlasikoala
 Tlingit, Alaska
 Tolowa-Tututni, Northern California
 Tsimshian
 Tsleil-waututh (Burrard), British Columbia
 Tulalip, Washington
 Twana, Washington
 Tzouk-e (Sooke), Vancouver Island
 Lower Umpqua, Oregon
 Upper Umpqua, Oregon
 Upper Skagit Washington
 Wuikinuxv (Owekeeno), BC Central Coast

Northwest Plateau

Chinook peoples
 Clackamas, OR
 Clatsop, OR
 Kathlamet (Cathlamet), Washington
 Multnomah
 Wasco-Wishram, OR and WA
 Watlata, WA

Interior Salish
 Chelan
 Coeur d'Alene Tribe, ID, MT, WA
 Entiat, WA
 Flathead (Selisch or Salish), ID, MT
 Bitterroot Salish
 Kalispel (Pend d'Oreilles), MT, WA
 Lower Kalispel, WA
 Upper Kalispel, MT
 In-SHUCK-ch, BC (Lower Lillooet)
 Lil'wat, BC (Lower Lillooet)
 Methow, WA
 Nespelem, WA
 Nlaka'pamux (Thompson people), BC
 Nicola people (Thompson-Okanagan confederacy)
 Sanpoil, WA
 Secwepemc, BC (Shuswap people)
 Sinixt (Lakes), BC, ID, and WA
 Sinkayuse (Sinkiuse-Columbia), WA (extinct)
 Spokane people, WA
 Syilx (Okanagan), BC, WA
 St'at'imc, BC (Upper Lillooet)
 Wenatchi (Wenatchee), WA

Sahaptin people
 Cowlitz, (Upper Cowlitz, Taidnapam), Washington
 Klickitat, Washington
 Nez Perce, Idaho
 Tenino (Tygh, Warm Springs), Oregon
 Umatilla, Idaho, Oregon
 Walla Walla, WA
 Wanapum, WA
 Wauyukma
 Wyam (Lower Deschutes)
 Yakama, WA

Other or both
 Cayuse, Oregon, Washington
 Celilo (Wayampam)
 Cowlitz, WA
 Fort Klamath, OR
 Kalapuya, northwest OR
 Atfalati (Tualatin, northwest OR
 Mohawk River, northwest OR
 Santiam, northwest OR
 Yaquina, northwest OR
 Kutenai (Kootenai, Ktunaxa), BC, ID, and MT
 Lower Snake people: Chamnapam, Wauyukma, Naxiyampam
 Modoc, formerly California, now Oklahoma and Oregon
 Molala (Molale), OR
 Nicola Athapaskans (extinct), BC
 Palus (Palouse), ID, OR, and WA
 Upper Nisqually (Mishalpan)

Great Plains 

Indigenous peoples of the Great Plains are often separated into Northern and Southern Plains tribes.

 Anishinaabeg (Anishinape, Anicinape, Neshnabé, Nishnaabe) (see also Subarctic, Northeastern Woodlands)
 Saulteaux (Nakawē), Manitoba, Minnesota and Ontario; later Alberta, British Columbia, Montana, Saskatchewan
 Odawa people (Ottawa), Ontario, Michigan, later Oklahoma
 Potawatomi, Michigan, Ontario, Indiana, Wisconsin, later Oklahoma
 Apache (see also Southwest)
 Lipan Apache, New Mexico, Texas
 Plains Apache (Kiowa Apache), Oklahoma
 Querecho Apache, Texas
 Arapaho (Arapahoe), formerly Colorado, currently Oklahoma and Wyoming
 Besawunena
 Nawathinehena
 Arikara (Arikaree, Arikari, Ree), North Dakota
 Atsina (Gros Ventre), Montana
 Blackfoot
 Kainai Nation (Káínaa, Blood), Alberta
 Northern Peigan (Aapátohsipikáni), Alberta
 Blackfeet, Southern Piegan (Aamsskáápipikani), Montana
 Siksika (Siksikáwa), Alberta
 Cheyenne, Montana, Oklahoma
 Suhtai, Montana, Oklahoma
 Comanche, Oklahoma, Texas
 Plains Cree, Montana
 Crow (Absaroka, Apsáalooke), Montana
 Escanjaques, Oklahoma
 Hidatsa, North Dakota
 Iowa (Ioway), Kansas, Nebraska, Oklahoma
 Kaw (Kansa, Kanza), Oklahoma
 Kiowa, Oklahoma
 Mandan, North Dakota
 Métis people (Canada), North Dakota, Manitoba, Saskatchewan, Alberta
 Missouri (Missouria), Oklahoma
 Omaha, Nebraska
 Osage, Oklahoma, formerly Arkansas, Missouri
 Otoe (Oto), Oklahoma
 Pawnee, Oklahoma
 Chaui, Oklahoma
 Kitkehakhi, Oklahoma
 Pitahawirata, Oklahoma
 Skidi, Oklahoma
 Ponca, Nebraska, Oklahoma
 Quapaw, formerly Arkansas, Oklahoma
 Sioux
 Dakota, Minnesota, Montana, Nebraska, North Dakota, South Dakota, Manitoba, Saskatchewan
 Santee, Nebraska
 Yankton, South Dakota
 Yanktonai, formerly Minnesota, currently Montana, North Dakota, and South Dakota
 Lakota (Teton), Montana, North Dakota, South Dakota, Saskatchewan
 Sičháŋǧu (Brulé, Burned Thighs)
 Oglála (Scatters Their Own)
 Itázipčho (Sans Arc, No Bows)
 Húŋkpapȟa (Hunkpapa)
 Mnikȟówožu (Miniconjou)
 Sihásapa (Blackfoot Sioux)
 Oóhenuŋpa (Two Kettles)
 Nakoda (Stoney), Alberta
 Nakota, Assiniboine (Assiniboin), Montana, Saskatchewan
 Teyas, Texas
 Tonkawa, Oklahoma
 Tsuu T’ina, (Sarcee, Sarsi, Tsuut’ina), Alberta
 Wichita and Affiliated Tribes (Kitikiti'sh), Oklahoma, formerly Texas and Kansas
 Kichai (also related to the Caddo), Oklahoma, formerly Texas and Kansas
 Taovayas (Tawehash), Oklahoma, formerly Texas and Kansas
 Tawakoni, Oklahoma, formerly Texas and Kansas
 Waco (Iscani, Yscani), Oklahoma, formerly Texas
 Wichita proper, Guichita, Rayados, Oklahoma, formerly Texas and Kansas

Eastern Woodlands

Northeastern Woodlands 

 Accomac people, formerly Eastern Shore of Virginia
 Accohannock, formerly Eastern Shore of Virginia
 Gingaskin, formerly Eastern Shore of Virginia
 Adena culture (1000–200 BCE) formerly Ohio, Indiana, West Virginia, Kentucky, New York, Pennsylvania, and Maryland
 Abenaki (Tarrantine), Quebec, Maine, New Brunswick, New Hampshire, and Vermont
 Eastern Abenaki, Quebec, Maine, and New Hampshire
 Kennebec (Caniba), Maine
 Western Abenaki: Quebec, Massachusetts, New Hampshire, and Vermont
 Annamessex, Annemessex, formerly Eastern Shore of Maryland
 Anishinaabeg (Anishinape, Anicinape, Neshnabé, Nishnaabe) (see also Subarctic, Plains)
 Algonquin, Quebec, Ontario
 Nipissing, Ontario
 Ojibwe (Chippewa, Ojibwa), Ontario, Michigan, Minnesota, and Wisconsin
 Mississaugas, Ontario
 Saulteaux (Nakawē), Ontario
 Odawa people (Ottawa), Indiana, Michigan, Ohio, Ontario; later Oklahoma
 Potawatomi, Illinois, Indiana, Michigan, Ontario, Wisconsin; later Kansas and Oklahoma
 Assateague, formerly Maryland
 Attawandaron (Neutral), formerlyOntario
 Beothuk, formerly Newfoundland
 Chowanoke, North Carolina
 Choptank people, Maryland
 Conoy, Virginia, Maryland
 Fort Ancient culture (1000–1750 CE), formerly Ohio, Kentucky, Indiana, and West Virginia
 Erie, formerly Pennsylvania, New York
 Etchemin, formerlyMaine
 Ho-Chunk (Winnebago), southern Wisconsin and Nebraska, formerly northern Illinois, formerly Iowa, and Nebraska
 Honniasont, formerly Pennsylvania, Ohio, West Virginia
 Hopewell tradition, formerly Ohio, Illinois, and Kentucky, and Black River region, 200 BCE–500 CE
 Housatonic, formerly Massachusetts, New York
 Illinois Confederacy (Illiniwek), formerly Illinois, Iowa, and Missouri
 Cahokia, formerly Illinois, Iowa, Missouri, Arkansas, now Oklahoma
 Kaskaskia, formerly Wisconsin, now Oklahoma
 Miami, formerly Illinois, Indiana, and Michigan, now Oklahoma
 Iroquois Confederacy (Haudenosaunee), Ontario, Quebec, and New York
 Cayuga, New York, Oklahoma
 Mohawk, New York and Kahnawake, Quebec
 Oneida, New York
 Onondaga, New York
 Seneca, New York and Oklahoma
 Mingo, formerly Pennsylvania, Ohio, West Virginia
 Tuscarora, formerly North Carolina, now New York
 Kickapoo, formerly Michigan, Illinois, Missouri, now Kansas, Oklahoma, Texas, Mexico
 Laurentian (St. Lawrence Iroquoians), formerly New York, Ontario, and Quebec, 14th century–1580 CE
 Lenni Lenape (Delaware), formerly Pennsylvania, Delaware, New Jersey, now Ontario, Wisconsin and Oklahoma
 Munsee-speaking subgroups, formerly Long Island and southeastern New York, now Wisconsin
 Canarsie (Canarsee), formerly Long Island New York
 Esopus, formerly New York, later Ontario and Wisconsin
 Hackensack, formerly New York
 Haverstraw (Rumachenanck), New York
 Kitchawank (Kichtawanks, Kichtawank), New York
 Minisink, formerly New York
 Navasink, to the east along the north shore of New Jersey
 Sanhican (Raritan), formerly Monmouth County, New Jersey
 Sinsink (Sintsink), Westchester County, New York
 Siwanoy, formerly New York and Connecticut
 Tappan, formerly New York
 Waoranecks
 Wappinger (Wecquaesgeek, Nochpeem), formerly New York
 Warranawankongs
 Wiechquaeskeck, formerly New York
 Wisquaskeck (Raritan), formerly Westchester County, New York
 Unami-speaking subgroups
 Acquackanonk, formerly Passaic River in northern New Jersey
 Okehocking, formerly southeast Pennsylvania
 Unalachtigo, formerly Delaware, New Jersey
 Mahican (Stockbridge Mahican) formerly Connecticut, Massachusetts, New York, and Vermont
 Manahoac, Virginia
 Mascouten, formerly Michigan
 Massachusett, formerly Massachusetts
 Ponkapoag, formerly Massachusetts
 Meherrin, Virginia, North Carolina
 Menominee, Wisconsin
 Meskwaki (Fox), formerly Michigan, now Iowa
 Mi'kmaq (Micmac), New Brunswick, Newfoundland and Labrador, Nova Scotia, Prince Edward Island, Quebec, and Maine
 Mohegan, Connecticut
 Monacan, Virginia
 Montaukett (Montauk), New York
 Monyton (Monetons, Monekot, Moheton) (Siouan), West Virginia and Virginia
 Nansemond, Virginia
 Nanticoke, Delaware and Maryland
 Narragansett, Rhode Island
 Niantic, coastal Connecticut
 Nipmuc (Nipmuck), Connecticut, Massachusetts, and Rhode Island
 Nottaway, Virginia
 Occaneechi (Occaneechee), Virginia
 Passamaquoddy, New Brunswick, and Maine
 Patuxent, Maryland
 Paugussett, Connecticut
 Potatuck, New York
 Peoria, Illinois, now Oklahoma
 Mitchigamea, formerly Illinois, now Oklahoma
 Moingona, formerly Illinois, now Oklahoma
 Tamaroa, formerly Illinois, now Oklahoma
 Wea, formerly Indiana, now Oklahoma
 Pennacook tribe, formerly Massachusetts, New Hampshire
 Penobscot, Maine
 Pequot, Connecticut
 Petun (Tionontate), Ontario
 Piscataway, Maryland
 Pocumtuc, western Massachusetts
 Podunk, formerly New York, eastern Hartford County, Connecticut
 Powhatan Confederacy, Virginia
 Appomattoc, Virginia
 Arrohateck, Virginia
 Chesapeake, Virginia
 Chesepian, Virginia
 Chickahominy, Virginia
 Kiskiack, Virginia
 Mattaponi, Virginia
 Nansemond, Virginia
 Paspahegh, Virginia
 Potomac (Patawomeck), Virginia
 Powhatan, Virginia
 Pamunkey, Virginia
 Quinnipiac, Connecticut, eastern New York, northern New Jersey
 Rappahannock, Virginia
 Sauk (Sac), formerly Michigan, now Iowa, Oklahoma
 Schaghticoke, western Connecticut
 Shawnee, formerly Ohio, Virginia, West Virginia, Pennsylvania, now Oklahoma
 Shinnecock, Long Island, New York
 Stegarake, formerly Virginia
 Stuckanox (Stukanox), Virginia
 Conestoga (Susquehannock), Maryland, Pennsylvania, New York, West Virginia
 Tauxenent (Doeg), Virginia
 Tunxis (Massaco), Connecticut
 Tuscarora, formerly North Carolina, Virginia, currently New York
 Tutelo (Nahyssan), Virginia
 Unquachog (Poospatuck), Long Island, New York
 Wabanaki, Maine, New Brunswick, Nova Scotia, Quebec
 Wampanoag, Massachusetts
 Nauset, Massachusetts
 Patuxet, Massachusetts
 Pokanoket, formerly Massachusetts, Rhode Island
 Wangunk (Mattabeset), formerly Connecticut
 Wawyachtonoc, formerly Connecticut, New York
 Weapemeoc, formerly northern North Carolina
 Wenro, formerly New York
 Wicocomico, formerly Maryland, Virginia
 Wolastoqiyik (Maliseet), Maine, New Brunswick, Nova Scotia, and Quebec
 Wyandot (Huron), Ontario south of Georgian Bay, now Oklahoma, Kansas, Michigan, and Wendake, Quebec

Southeastern Woodlands 

 Acolapissa (Colapissa), Louisiana and Mississippi
 Ais, eastern coastal Florida
 Alafay (Alafia, Pojoy, Pohoy, Costas Alafeyes, Alafaya Costas), Florida
 Amacano, Florida west coast
 Apalachee, northwestern Florida
 Atakapa (Attacapa), Louisiana west coast and Texas southwestern coast
 Akokisa, Texas southeast coast
 Bidai, Texas southeast coast
 Deadose, eastern Texas
 Eastern Atakapa, western coastal Louisiana
 Orcoquiza, southeast Texas
 Patiri, eastern Texas
 Tlacopsel, southeast Texas
 Avoyel ("little Natchez"), Louisiana
 Bayogoula, southeastern Louisiana
 Biloxi, Mississippi
 Caddo Confederacy, Arkansas, Louisiana, Oklahoma, Texas
 Adai (Adaizan, Adaizi, Adaise, Adahi, Adaes, Adees, Atayos), Louisiana and Texas
 Cahinnio, southern Arkansas
 Doustioni, north central Louisiana
 Eyeish (Hais), eastern Texas
 Hainai, eastern Texas
 Hasinai, eastern Texas
 Kadohadacho, northeastern Texas, southwestern Arkansas, northwestern Louisiana
 Nabedache, eastern Texas
 Nabiti, eastern Texas
 Nacogdoche, eastern Texas
 Nacono, eastern Texas
 Nadaco, eastern Texas
 Nanatsoho, northeastern Texas
 Nasoni, eastern Texas
 Natchitoches, Lower: central Louisiana, Upper: northeastern Texas
 Neche, eastern Texas
 Nechaui, eastern Texas
 Ouachita, northern Louisiana
 Tula, western Arkansas
 Yatasi, northwestern Louisiana
 Calusa, southwestern Florida
 Cape Fear Indians, North Carolina southern coast
 Catawba (Esaw, Usheree, Ushery, Yssa), North Carolina, South Carolina
 Chacato, Florida panhandle and southern Alabama
 Chakchiuma, Alabama and Mississippi
 Chatot people (Chacato, Chactoo), west Florida
 Chawasha (Washa), Louisiana
 Cheraw (Chara, Charàh), North Carolina
 Cherokee, western North Carolina, eastern Tennessee, later Georgia, northwestern South Carolina, northern Alabama, Arkansas, Texas, Mexico, and currently North Carolina and Oklahoma
 Chickanee (Chiquini), North Carolina
 Chickasaw, Alabama and Mississippi, later Oklahoma
 Chicora, coastal South Carolina
 Chine, Florida
 Chisca (Cisca), southwestern Virginia
 Chitimacha, Louisiana
 Choctaw, Mississippi, Alabama, and parts of Louisiana; later Oklahoma
 Chowanoc (Chowanoke), North Carolina
 Congaree (Canggaree), South Carolina
 Coree, North Carolina
 Croatan, North Carolina
 Cusabo coastal South Carolina
 Eno, North Carolina
 Grigra (Gris), Mississippi
 Guacata (Santalûces), eastern coastal Florida
 Guacozo, Florida
 Guale (Cusabo, Iguaja, Ybaja), coastal Georgia
 Guazoco, southwestern Florida coast
 Houma, Louisiana and Mississippi
 Jaega (Jobe), eastern coastal Florida
 Jaupin (Weapemoc), North Carolina
 Jororo, Florida interior
 Keyauwee, North Carolina
 Koasati (Coushatta), formerly eastern Tennessee, currently Louisiana, Oklahoma, and Texas
 Koroa, Mississippi
 Luca, southwestern Florida coast
 Lumbee, North Carolina
 Machapunga, North Carolina
 Matecumbe (Matacumbêses, Matacumbe, Matacombe), Florida Keys
 Mayaca, Florida
 Mayaimi (Mayami), interior Florida
 Mayajuaca, Florida
 Mikasuki (Miccosukee), Florida
 Mobila (Mobile, Movila), northwestern Florida and southern Alabama
 Mocoso, western Florida
 Mougoulacha, Mississippi
 Muscogee (Creek), Tennessee, Georgia, Alabama, Mississippi, Florida, later Oklahoma
 Abihka, Alabama, later Oklahoma
 Alabama, formerly Alabama, southwestern Tennessee, and northwestern Mississippi, now Oklahoma and Texas
 Pakana (Pacâni, Pagna, Pasquenan, Pak-ká-na, Pacanas), central Alabama, later Texas
 Apalachicola Province, (Lower Towns of the Muscogee (Creek) Confederacy), Alabama and Georgia
 Apalachicola (town), Alabama, Georgia and South Carolina
 Hitchiti, Alabama and Georgia
 Oconi, Alabama and Georgia
 Sabacola (Sawakola, Sabacôla, Savacola, Sawokli), Alabama and Georgia
 Chiaha, Creek Confederacy, Alabama
 Eufaula tribe, Georgia, later Oklahoma
 Kialegee Tribal Town, Alabama, later Oklahoma
 Osochee (Osochi, Oswichee, Usachi, Oosécha), Creek Confederacy, Alabama
 Talapoosa, Creek Confederacy, Alabama
 Thlopthlocco Tribal Town, Alabama, Georgia, later Oklahoma
 Tukabatchee, Muscogee Creek Confederacy, Alabama
 Naniaba, northwestern Florida and southern Alabama
 Natchez, Louisiana and Mississippi later Oklahoma
 Neusiok (Newasiwac, Neuse River Indians), North Carolina
 Norwood culture, Apalachee region, Florida, c. 12,000–4500 BCE
 Ofo, Arkansas and Mississippi, eastern Tennessee
 Okchai (Ogchay), central Alabama
 Okelousa, Louisiana
 Opelousas, Louisiana
 Pacara, Florida
 Pamlico, formerly North Carolina
 Pascagoula, Mississippi coast
 Pee Dee (Pedee), South Carolina and North Carolina
 Pensacola, Florida panhandle and southern Alabama
 Potoskeet, North Carolina
 Quinipissa, southeastern Louisiana and Mississippi
 Roanoke, North Carolina
 Saluda (Saludee, Saruti), South Carolina
 Santee (Seretee, Sarati, Sati, Sattees), South Carolina (no relation to Santee Sioux), South Carolina
 Santa Luces, Florida
 Saponi, North Carolina, Virginia
 Saura, North Carolina
 Saxapahaw (Sissipahaw, Sissipahua, Shacioes), North Carolina
 Secotan, North Carolina
 Seminole, Florida and Oklahoma
 Sewee (Suye, Joye, Xoye, Soya), South Carolina coast
 Shakori, North Carolina
 Shoccoree (Haw), North Carolina, possibly Virginia
 Sissipahaw, North Carolina
 Sugeree (Sagarees, Sugaws, Sugar, Succa), North Carolina and South Carolina
 Surruque, east central Florida
 Suteree (Sitteree,  Sutarees, Sataree), North Carolina
 Taensa, Mississippi
 Taposa, Mississippi
 Tawasa, Alabama
 Tequesta, southeastern coastal Florida
 Timucua, Florida and Georgia
 Acuera, central Florida
 Agua Fresca (or Agua Dulce or Freshwater), interior northeast Florida
 Arapaha, north central Florida and south central Georgia?
 Cascangue, coastal southeast Georgia
 Icafui (or Icafi), coastal southeast Georgia
 Mocama (or Tacatacuru), coastal northeast Florida and coastal southeast Georgia
 Northern Utina north central Florida
 Ocale, central Florida
 Oconi, interior southeast Georgia
 Potano, north central Florida
 Saturiwa, northeast Florida
 Tacatacuru, coastal southeast Georgia
 Tucururu (or Tucuru), central? Florida
 Utina (or Eastern Utina), northeast central Florida
 Yufera, coastal southeast Georgia
 Yui (Ibi), coastal southeast Georgia
 Yustaga, north central Florida
 Tiou (Tioux), Mississippi
 Tocaste, Florida
 Tocobaga, Florida
 Tohomé, northwestern Florida and southern Alabama
 Tomahitan, eastern Tennessee
 Topachula,  Florida
 Tunica, Arkansas and Mississippi
 Utiza, Florida
 Uzita, Tampa Bay, Florida
 Vicela, Florida
 Viscaynos, Florida
 Waccamaw, South Carolina
 Waccamaw Siouan, North Carolina
 Wateree (Guatari, Watterees), North Carolina
 Waxhaw (Waxsaws, Wisack, Wisacky, Weesock, Flathead), North Carolina and South Carolina
 Westo, Virginia and South Carolina, extinct
 Winyaw, South Carolina coast
 Woccon, North Carolina
 Yamasee, Florida, Georgia
 Yazoo, southeastern tip of Arkansas, eastern Louisiana, Mississippi
 Yuchi (Euchee), central Tennessee, then northwest Georgia, now Oklahoma

Great Basin 

 Ahwahnechee, Yosemite Valley, California
 Bannock, Idaho
 Southern Paiute, Arizona, Nevada, Utah
 Chemehuevi, southeastern California
 Kaibab, northwestern Arizona
 Kaiparowtis, southwestern Utah
 Moapa, southern Nevada
 Panaca
 Panguitch, Utah
 Paranigets, southern Nevada
 Shivwits, southwestern Utah
 Coso People, of Coso Rock Art District in the Coso Range, Mojave Desert California
 Fremont culture (400 CE–1300 CE), formerly Utah
 Kawaiisu, southern inland California
 Mono, southeastern California
 Eastern Mono, southeastern California
 Western Mono or Owens Valley Paiute, eastern California and Nevada
 Northern Paiute, eastern California, Nevada, Oregon, southwestern Idaho
Kucadikadi, Mono Lake Paiute, Mono Lake, California
 Shoshone (Shoshoni), California, Idaho, Nevada, Utah, Wyoming
 Eastern Shoshone people:
 Guchundeka', Kuccuntikka, Buffalo Eaters
 Tukkutikka, Tukudeka, Mountain Sheep Eaters, joined the Northern Shoshone
 Boho'inee', Pohoini, Pohogwe, Sage Grass people, Sagebrush Butte People
Northern Shoshone, Idaho
 Agaideka, Salmon Eaters, Lemhi, Snake River and Lemhi River Valley
 Doyahinee', Mountain people
 Kammedeka, Kammitikka, Jack Rabbit Eaters, Snake River, Great Salt Lake
 Hukundüka, Porcupine Grass Seed Eaters, Wild Wheat Eaters, possibly synonymous with Kammitikka
 Tukudeka, Dukundeka', Sheep Eaters (Mountain Sheep Eaters), Sawtooth Range, Idaho
 Yahandeka, Yakandika, Groundhog Eaters, lower Boise, Payette, and Wiser Rivers
 Western Shoshone people:
Kusiutta, Goshute (Gosiute), Great Salt Desert and Great Salt Lake, Utah
Cedar Valley Goshute
Deep Creek Goshute
Rush Valley Goshute
Skull Valley Goshute, Wipayutta, Weber Ute
Tooele Valley Goshute
Trout Creek Goshute
Kuyatikka, Kuyudikka, Bitterroot Eaters, Halleck, Mary's River, Clover Valley, Smith Creek Valley, Nevada
Mahaguadüka, Mentzelia Seed Eaters, Ruby Valley, Nevada
Painkwitikka, Penkwitikka, Fish Eaters, Cache Valley, Idaho and Utah
Pasiatikka, Redtop Grass Eaters, Deep Creek Gosiute, Deep Creek Valley, Antelope Valley
Tipatikka, Pinenut Eaters, northernmost band
Tsaiduka, Tule Eaters, Railroad Valley, Nevada
Tsogwiyuyugi, Elko, Nevada
Waitikka, Ricegrass Eaters, Ione Valley, Nevada
Watatikka, Ryegrass Seed Eaters, Ruby Valley, Nevada
Wiyimpihtikka, Buffalo Berry Eaters
 Timbisha, aka Panamint or Koso, southeastern California
 Ute, Colorado, Utah, northern New Mexico
 Capote, southeastern Colorado and New Mexico
 Moanunts, Salina, Utah
 Muache, south and central Colorado
 Pahvant, western Utah
 Sanpits, central Utah
 Timpanogots, north central Utah
 Uintah, Utah
 Uncompahgre or Taviwach, central and northern Colorado
 Weeminuche, western Colorado, eastern Utah, northwestern New Mexico
 White River Utes (Parusanuch and Yampa), Colorado and eastern Utah
 Washo, Nevada and California
 Palagewan
 Pahkanapil

California 

Nota bene: The California cultural area does not exactly conform to the state of California's boundaries, and many tribes on the eastern border with Nevada are classified as Great Basin tribes and some tribes on the Oregon border are classified as Plateau tribes.

 Achomawi, Achumawi, Pit River tribe, northeastern California
 Atsugewi, northeastern California
 Cahuilla, southern California
 Chumash, coastal southern California
 Barbareño
 Cruzeño, Island Chumash
 Inezeño, Ineseño
 Obispeño, Northern Chumash
 Purisimeño
 Ventureño
 Chilula, northwestern California
 Chimariko, extinct, northwestern California
 Cupeño, southern California
 Eel River Athapaskan peoples
 Lassik, northwestern California
 Mattole (Bear River), northwestern California
 Nongatl, northwestern California
 Sinkyone, northwestern California
 Wailaki, Wai-lakki, northwestern California
 Esselen, west-central California
 Hupa, northwestern California
 Tsnungwe
 Juaneño, Acjachemem, southwestern California
 Karok, northwestern California
 Kato, Cahto, northwestern California
 Kitanemuk, south-central California
 Konkow, northern-central California
 Kumeyaay, Diegueño, Kumiai
 Ipai, southwestern California
 Jamul, southwestern California
 Tipai, southwestern California and northwestern Mexico
 La Jolla complex, southern California, c. 6050–1000 BCE
 Luiseño, southwestern California
 Maidu, northeastern California
 Konkow, northern California
 Mechoopda, northern California
 Nisenan, Southern Maidu, northern California
 Miwok, Me-wuk, central California
 Coast Miwok, west-central California
 Lake Miwok, west-central California
 Valley and Sierra Miwok
 Monache, Western Mono, central California
 Nisenan, eastern-central California
 Nomlaki, northwestern California
 Ohlone, Costanoan, west-central California
 Awaswas
 Chalon
 Chochenyo
 Karkin
 Mutsun
 Ramaytush
 Rumsen
 Tamyen
 Yelamu
 Patwin, central California
 Suisun, Southern Patwin, central California
 Pauma Complex, southern California, c. 6050–1000 BCE
 Pomo, northwestern and central-western California
 Salinan, coastal central California
 Antoniaño
 Migueleño
 Serrano, southern California
 Shasta northwestern California
 Konomihu, northwestern California
 Okwanuchu, northwestern California
 Tataviam, Allilik (Fernandeño), southern California
 Tolowa, northwestern California
 Tongva, Gabrieleño, Fernandeño, San Clemente tribe, coastal southern California
 Tubatulabal, south-central California
 Wappo, north-central California
 Whilkut, northwestern California
 Wintu, northwestern California
 Wiyot, northwestern California
 Yana, northern-central California
 Yahi
 Yokuts, central and southern California
 Chukchansi, Foothill Yokuts, central California
 Northern Valley Yokuts, central California
 Tachi tribe, Southern Valley Yokuts, south-central California
 Yuki, Ukomno'm, northwestern California
 Huchnom, northwestern California
 Yurok, northwestern California

Southwest 

This region is also called "Oasisamerica" and includes parts of what is now Arizona, Southern Colorado, New Mexico, Western Texas, Southern Utah, Chihuahua, and Sonora

 Ak Chin, Arizona
 Akimel O'odham (Pima), Arizona
 Southern Athabaskan
 Chiricahua Apache, New Mexico and Oklahoma
 Jicarilla Apache, New Mexico
 Lipan Apache, Texas
 Mescalero Apache, New Mexico
 Navajo (Navaho, Diné), Arizona and New Mexico
 San Carlos Apache, Arizona
 Tonto Apache, Arizona
 Western Apache (Coyotero Apache), Arizona
 White Mountain Apache, Arizona
 Comecrudo, Texas, northern Mexico
 Cotoname (Carrizo de Camargo)
 Genízaro, Arizona, New Mexico
 Halchidhoma, Arizona and California
 Hualapai, Arizona
 Havasupai, Arizona
 Houma, Louisiana
 Hohokam, formerly Arizona
 Karankawa, Texas
 Kavelchadhom
 La Junta, Texas, Chihuahua
 Mamulique, Texas, northern Mexico
 Manso, Texas, Chihuahua
 Maricopa, Arizona
 Mojave, Arizona, California, and Nevada
 Pima Bajo
 Pueblo peoples, Arizona, New Mexico, Western Texas
 Ancestral Pueblo, formerly Arizona, Colorado, New Mexico, Utah
 Hopi-Tewa (Arizona Tewa, Hano), Arizona, joined the Hopi during the Pueblo Revolt
 Hopi, Arizona
 Keres people, New Mexico
 Acoma Pueblo, New Mexico
 Cochiti Pueblo, New Mexico
 Kewa Pueblo (formerly Santo Domingo Pueblo), New Mexico
 Laguna Pueblo, New Mexico
 San Felipe Pueblo, New Mexico
 Santa Ana Pueblo, New Mexico
 Zia Pueblo, New Mexico
 Tewa people, New Mexico
 Nambé Pueblo, New Mexico
 Ohkay Owingeh (formerly San Juan Pueblo), New Mexico
 Pojoaque Pueblo, New Mexico
 San Ildefonso Pueblo, New Mexico
 Tesuque Pueblo, New Mexico
 Santa Clara Pueblo, New Mexico
 Tiwa people, New Mexico
 Isleta Pueblo, New Mexico
 Picuris Pueblo, New Mexico
 Sandia Pueblo, New Mexico
 Taos Pueblo, New Mexico
 Ysleta del Sur Pueblo (Tigua Pueblo), Texas
 Piro Pueblo, New Mexico
 Towa people
 Jemez Pueblo (Walatowa), New Mexico
 Pecos (Ciquique) Pueblo, New Mexico
 Zuni people (Ashiwi), New Mexico
 Quechan (Yuma), Arizona and California
 Quems
 Solano, Coahuila, Texas
 Tamique
 Toboso
 Tohono O'odham, Arizona and Mexico
 Qahatika, Arizona
 Tompiro
 Ubate
 Walapai, Arizona
 Yaqui (Yoreme), Arizona, Sonora
 Yavapai, Arizona
 Tolkapaya (Western Yavapai), Arizona
 Yavapé (Northwestern Yavapai), Arizona
 Kwevkapaya (Southeastern Yavapai), Arizona
 Wipukpa (Northeastern Yavapai), Arizona

Mexico and Mesoamerica 
The regions of Oasisamerica, Aridoamerica, and Mesoamerica span multiple countries and overlap.

Aridoamerica 

 Acaxee
 Aranama (Hanáma, Hanáme, Chaimamé, Chariname, Xaraname, Taraname), southeast Texas
 Coahuiltecan, Texas, northern Mexico
 Chichimeca
 Caxcan (Caxcane)
 Guachichil
 Guamare
 Pame
 Tecuexe
 Zacatec
 Cochimí, Baja California
 Cocopa, Arizona, northern Mexico
 Garza, Texas, northern Mexico
 Guachimontone
 Guamare
 Guaycura, Baja California
 Guarijío, Huarijío, Chihuahua, Sonora
 Huichol (Wixáritari), Nayarit, Jalisco, Zacatecas, and Durango
 Kiliwa, Baja California
 Mayo, Sonora and Sinaloa
 Monqui, Baja California
 Paipai, Akwa'ala, Kw'al, Baja California
 Opata
 Otomi, central Mexico
 Patiri, southeastern Texas
 Pericúe, Baja California
 Pima Bajo
 Seri
 Tarahumara
 Tepecano
 Tepehuán
 Terocodame, Texas and Mexico
 Codam
 Hieroquodame
 Oodame
 Perocodame
 Teroodame
 Teuchitlan tradition
 Western Mexico shaft tomb tradition
 Yaqui, Sonora and now southern Arizona
 Zacateco

Mesoamerica 

 Nahua, Guatemala and Mexico
 Alaguilac, Guatemala
 Cora people
 Huastec
 Huave (Wabi), Juchitán District, Oaxaca
 Lenca
 Maya, Belize, El Salvador, Guatemala, Honduras, and Mexico
 Itzá, Petén Department, Guatemala
 Lacandon
 Mopan, Belize, Guatemala
 Yucatec (Maya proper)
 Achi, Guatemala
 Akatek, Guatemala
 Ch'ol
 Ch'orti', southeastern Guatemala, northwestern Honduras, and northern El Salvador
 Ixil, El Quiché, Guatemala
 Jacaltec (Jakaltek), northwestern Guatemala
 K'iche' (Quiché), El Salvador and Guatemala
 Kaqchikel
 Kekchi
 Mam
 Poqomam
 Tojolabales
 Tzotzil
 Tzeltal
 Tz'utujil
 Mazatec
 Mixtec
 Olmec
 Otomi
 Pipil
 Purépecha, also known as Tarascan
 Tlapanec
 Xinca
 Zapotec
 Toltec (900–1168 CE), Tula, Hildago

Circum-Caribbean 

Partially organized per Handbook of South American Indians.

Caribbean 
Anthropologist Julian Steward defined the Antilles cultural area, which includes all of the Antilles and Bahamas, except for Trinidad and Tobago.

 Arawak
 Taino, Greater Antilles, northern Lesser Antilles
 Lucayan, Bahamas
 Igneri, Lesser Antilles, 400–1000 CE
 Nepoya, Trinidad
 Suppoya, Trinidad
 Caquetio, Aruba, Bonaire, Curaçao, and Venezuela
 Carib, Lesser Antilles
 Garifuna ("Black Carib"), Originally Dominica and Saint Vincent, currently Belize, Guatemala, Honduras and Nicaragua
 Ciboney, Greater Antilles, c. 1000–300 BCE
 Guanahatabey (Guanajatabey), Cuba, 1000 BCE
 Ciguayo, Hispaniola
 Garifuna ("Black Carib"), Originally Dominica and Saint Vincent, currently Belize, Guatemala, Honduras and Nicaragua
 Ortoiroid, c. 5500–200 BCE
 Coroso culture, Puerto Rico, 1000 BCE–200 CE
 Krum Bay culture, Virgin Islands, St. Thomas, 1500–200 BCE
 Saladoid culture, 500 BCE–545 CE

Central America 
The Central American culture area includes part of El Salvador, most of Honduras, all of Nicaragua, Costa Rica, and Panama, and some peoples on or near the Pacific coasts of Colombia and Ecuador.

 Bagaces, Costa Rica
 Bokota, Panama
 Boruca, Costa Rica
 Bribri, Costa Rica
 Cabécar, Costa Rica
 Cacaopera (Matagalpa, Ulua), formerly El Salvador
 Cayada, Ecuador
 Changuena, Panama
 Embera-Wounaan (Chocó, Wounaan), Colombia, Panama
 Choluteca, Honduras
 Coiba, Costa Rica
 Coito, Costa Rica
 Corobici, Costa Rica
 Desaguadero, Costa Rica
 Dorasque, Panama
 Guatuso, Costa Rica
 Guaymí, Panama
 Movere, Panama
 Murire, Panama
 Guetar, Costa Rica
 Kuna (Guna), Panama and Colombia
 Lenca, Honduras and El Salvador
 Mangue, Nicaragua
 Maribichocoa, Honduras and Nicaragua
 Miskito, Hondrus, Nicaragua
 Miskito Sambu
 Tawira Miskito
 Nagrandah, Nicaragua
 Ngöbe Buglé, Bocas del Toro, Panama
 Nicarao, Nicaragua
 Nicoya, Costa Rica
 Orotiña, Costa Rica
 Paparo, Panama
 Paya, Honduras
 Pech, northeastern Honduras
 Piria, Nicaragua
 Poton, Honduras and El Salvador
 Quepo, Costa Rica
 Rama, Nicaragua
 Sigua, Panama
 Subtiaba, Nicaragua
 Suerre, Costa Rica
 Sumo (Mayagna), Honduras and Nicaragua
 Terraba (Naso, Teribe, Tjër Di), Panama
 Tojar, Panama
 Tolupan (Jicaque), Honduras
 Ulva, El Salvador, Honduras and Nicaragua
 Voto, Costa Rica
 Yasika, Nicaragua

Colombia and Venezuela 
The Colombia and Venezuela culture area includes most of Colombia and Venezuela. Southern Colombia is in the Andean culture area, as are some peoples of central and northeastern Colombia, who are surrounded by peoples of the Colombia and Venezuela culture. Eastern Venezuela is in the Guianas culture area, and southeastern Colombia and southwestern Venezuela are in the Amazonia culture area.

 Abibe, northwestern Colombia
 Aburrá, central Colombia
 Achagua (Axagua), eastern Colombia, western Venezuela
 Agual, western Colombia
 Amaní, central Colombia
 Ancerma, western Colombia
 Andaqui (Andaki), Huila Department, Colombia
 Andoque, Andoke, southeastern Colombia
 Antiochia, Colombia
 Arbi, western Colombia
 Arma, western Colombia
 Atunceta, western Colombia
 Auracana, northeastern Colombia
 Buriticá, western Colombia
 Caquetio, western Venezuela
 Calamari, northwestern Colombia
 Calima culture, western Colombia, 200 BCE–400 CE
 Caramanta, western Columbia
 Carate, northeastern Colombia
 Carare, northeastern Colombia
 Carex, northwestern Colombia
 Cari, western Colombia
 Carrapa, western Colombia
 Cartama, western Colombia
 Cauca, western Colombia
 Corbago, northeastern Colombia
 Cosina, northeastern Colombia
 Catio, northwestern Colombia
 Cenú, northwestern Colombia
 Cenufaná, northwestern Colombia
 Chanco, western Colombia
 Coanoa, northeastern Colombia
 Cuiba, east Colombia west Venezuela
 Cuica, western Venezuela
 Cumanagoto, eastern Venezuela
 Evéjito, western Colombia
 Fincenú, northwestern Colombia
 Gorrón, western Colombia
 Guahibo (Guajibo), eastern Colombia, southern Venezuela
 Guambía, western Colombia
 Guanes, Colombia, pre-Columbian culture
 Guanebucan, northeastern Colombia
 Guazuzú, northwestern Colombia
 Hiwi, western Colombia, eastern Venezuela
 Jamundí, western Colombia
 Kari'ña,  eastern Venezuela
 Kogi, northern Colombia
 Lile, western Colombia
 Lache, central Colombia
 Mariche, central Venezuela
 Maco (Mako, Itoto, Wotuja, or Jojod), northeastern Colombia and western Venezuela
 Mompox, northwestern Colombia
 Motilone, northeastern Colombia and western Venezuela
 Naura, central Colombia
 Nauracota, central Colombia
 Noanamá (Waunana, Huaunana, Woun Meu), northwestern Colombia and Panama
 Nutabé, northwestern Colombia
 Opón, northeastern Colombia
 Pacabueye, northwestern Colombia
 Pancenú, northwestern Colombia
 Patángoro, central Colombia
 Paucura, western Colombia
 Pemed, northwestern Colombia
 Pequi people, western Colombia
 Picara, western Colombia
 Pozo, western Colombia
 Pumé (Yaruro), Venezuela
 Quimbaya, central Colombia, 4th–7th centuries CE
 Quinchia, western Colombia
 Sutagao, central Colombian
 Tahamí, northwestern Colombia
 Tairona, northern Colombia, pre-Columbian culture, 1st–11th centuries CE
 Tamalameque, northwestern Colombia
 Mariche, central Venezuela
 Timba, western Colombia
 Timote, western Venezuela
 Tinigua, Caquetá Department, Colombia
 Tolú, northwestern Colombia
 Toro, western Colombia
 Tupe, northeastern Colombia
 Turbaco people, northwestern Colombia
 Urabá, northwestern Colombia
 Urezo, northwestern Colombia
 U'wa, eastern Colombia, western Venezuela
 Waikerí, eastern Venezuela
 Wayuu (Wayu, Wayúu, Guajiro, Wahiro), northeastern Colombia and northwestern Venezuela
 Xiriguana, northeastern Colombia
 Yamicí, northwestern Colombia
 Yapel, northwestern Colombia
 Yarigui, northeastern Colombia
 Yukpa, Yuko, northeastern Colombia
 Zamyrua, northeastern Colombia
 Zendagua, northwestern Colombia
 Zenú, northwestern Colombia, pre-Columbian culture, 200 BCE–1600 CE
 Zopia, western Colombia

Guianas 

This region includes northern parts Colombia, French Guiana, Guyana, Suriname, Venezuela, and parts of the Amazonas, Amapá, Pará, and Roraima States in Brazil.

 Acawai (6N 60W)
 Acokwa (3N 53W)
 Acuria (Akurio, Akuriyo), 5N 55W, Suriname
 Akawaio, Roraima, Brazil, Guyana, and Venezuela
 Amariba (2N 60W)
 Amicuana (2N 53W)
 Apalaí (Apalai), Amapá, Brazil
 Apirua (3N 53W)
 Apurui (3N 53W)
 Aracaret (4N 53W)
 Aramagoto (2N 54W)
 Aramisho (2N 54W)
 Arebato (7N 65W)
 Arekena (2N 67W)
 Arhuaco, northeastern Colombia
 Arigua
 Arinagoto (4N 63W)
 Arua (1N 50W)
 Aruacay, Venezuela
 Atorai (2N 59W)
 Atroahy (1S 62W)
 Auaké, Brazil and Guyana
 Baniwa (Baniva) (3N 68W), Brazil, Colombia and Venezuela
 Baraüana (1N 65W)
 Bonari (3S 58W)
 Baré (3N 67W)
 Caberre (4N 71 W)
 Cadupinago
 Cariaya (1S 63 W)
 Carib (Kalinago), Venezuela
 Carinepagoto, Trinidad
 Chaguan, Venezuela
 Chaima, Venezuela
 Cuaga, Venezuela
 Cuacua, Venezuela
 Cumanagoto, Venezuela
 Guayano, Venezuela
 Guinau (4N 65W)
 Hixkaryána, Amazonas, Brazil
 Hodï, Venezuela
 Inao (4N 65W)
 Ingarikó, Brazil, Guyana and Venezuela
 Jaoi (Yao), Guyana, Trinidad and Venezuela
 Kali'na, Brazil, Guyana, French Guiana, Suriname, Venezuela
 Lokono (Arawak, Locono), Guyana, Trinidad, Venezuela
 Macapa (2N 59W)
 Macushi, Brazil and Guyana
 Maipure (4N 67W)
 Maopityan (2N 59W)
 Mapoyo (Mapoye), Venezuela
 Marawan (3N 52W)
 Mariusa, Venezuela
 Marourioux (3N 53W)
 Nepuyo (Nepoye), Guyana, Trinidad and Venezuela
 Orealla, Guyana
 Palengue, Venezuela
 Palikur, Brazil, French Guiana
 Parauana (2N 63W)
 Parauien (3S 60W)
 Pareco, Venezuela
 Paria, Venezuela
 Patamona, Roraima, Brazil
 Pauishana (2N 62W)
 Pemon (Arecuna), Brazil, Guyana, and Venezuela
 Piapoco (3N 70W)
 Piaroa, Venezuela
 Pino (3N 54W)
 Piritú, Venezuela
 Purui (2N 52W)
 Saliba (Sáliva), Venezuela
 Sanumá, Venezuela, Brazil
 Shebayo, Trinidad
 Sikiana (Chikena, Xikiyana), Brazil, Suriname
 Tagare, Venezuela
 Tamanaco, Venezuela
 Tarumá (3S 60W)
 Tibitibi, Venezuela
 Tiriyó (Tarëno), Brazil, Suriname
 Tocoyen (3N 53W)
 Tumuza, Venezuela
 Wai-Wai, Amazonas, Brazil and Guyana
 Wapishana, Brazil and Guyana
 Warao (Warrau), Guyana and Venezuela
 Wayana (Oyana), Pará, Brazil
 Ya̧nomamö (Yanomami), Venezuela and Amazonas, Brazil
 Ye'kuana, Venezuela, Brazil

Eastern Brazil 
This region includes parts of the Ceará, Goiás, Espírito Santo, Mato Grosso, Mato Grosso do Sul, Pará, and Santa Catarina states of Brazil

 Apinajé (Apinaye Caroyo), Rio Araguiaia
 Arara, Pará
 Atikum, Bahia and Pernambuco
 Bororo, Mato Grosso
 Botocudo (Lakiãnõ)
 Carijo Guaraní
 East Brazilian tradition, Precolumbian culture
 Guató (Guato), Mato Grosso
 Kadiwéu (Guaicuru), Mato Grosso do Sul
 Kaingang
 Karajá (Iny, Javaé), Goiás, Mato Grosso, Pará, and Tocantins
 Kaxixó, Minas Gerais
 Kayapo (Cayapo, Mebêngôkre), Mato Grosso and Pará
 Laklãnõ, Santa Catarina
 Mehim (Krahô, Crahao), Rio Tocantins
 Ofayé, Mato Grosso do Sul
 Parakatêjê (Gavião), Pará
 Pataxó, Bahia
 Potiguara (Pitigoares), Ceará
 Tabajara, Ceará
 Tapirapé (Tapirape)
 Terena, Mato Gross and Mato Grosso do Sul, Brazil
 Tupiniquim, Espírito Santo
 Umutina (Barbados)
 Xakriabá (Chakriaba, Chikriaba, or Shacriaba), Minas Gerais
 Xavánte (Shavante), Mato Grosso
 Xerénte (Sherente), Goiás
 Xucuru, Pernambuco

Andes 

 Andean Hunting-Collecting tradition, Argentina, 11,000–4,000 CE
 Awa-Kwaiker, northern Ecuador, southern Colombia
 Aymara, Bolivia, Chile, Peru
 Callawalla (Callahuaya), Bolivia
 Cañari, Ecuador
 Capulí culture, Ecuador, 800–1500 CE
 Cerro Narrio (Chaullabamba) (Precolumbian culture)
 Chachapoyas, Amazonas, Peru
 Chachilla (Cayapas)
 Chanka (Chanca), Peru
 Chavín, northern Peru, 900–200 BCE
 Chincha people, Peru (Precolumbian culture)
 Chipaya, Oruro Department, Bolivia
 Chuquibamba culture (Precolumbian culture)
 Conchucos
 Diaguita
 Amaicha, Argentina
 Calchaquí, Argentina
 Chicoana, Salta, Argentina
 Quilmes (Precolumbian culture), Argentina
 Guangaia (Precolumbian culture)
 Ichuña microlithic tradition (Precolumbian culture)
 Inca Empire (Inka), based in Peru
 Jama-Coaque (Precolumbian culture)
 Killke culture, Peru, 900–1200 CE
 Kogi
 Kolla (Colla), Argentina, Bolivia, Chile
 La Tolita (Precolumbian culture)
 Las Vegas culture, coastal Ecuador, 8000 BCE–4600 BCE
 Lauricocha culture, Peru, 8000–2500 BCE
 Lima culture, Peru, 100–650 CE
 Maina, Ecuador, Peru
 Manteño-Huancavilca (Precolumbian culture)
 Milagro (Precolumbian culture)
 Mollo culture, Bolivia, 1000–1500 CE
 Muisca, Colombian highlands (Precolumbian culture)
 Pachacama (Precolumbian culture)
 Paez (Nasa culture), Colombian highlands (Precolumbian culture)
 Panzaleo (Precolumbian culture)
 Pasto
 Pijao, Colombia
 Quechua (Kichua, Kichwa), Bolivia
 Chankas
 Huancas
 Quitu culture, 2000 BCE–1550 CE
 Salinar (Precolumbian culture)
 Saraguro
 Tiwanaku culture (Tiahuanaco), 400–1000 CE, Bolivia
 Tsáchila (Colorado), Ecuador
 Tuza-Piartal (Precolumbian culture)
 Uru, Bolivia, Peru
 Uru-Murato, Bolivia
 Wari culture, central coast and highlands of Peru, 500–1000 CE
 Pocra culture, Ayacucho Province, Peru, 500–1000 CE

Pacific lowlands 

 Amotape complex, northern coastal Peru, 9,000–7,100 BCE
 Atacameño (Atacama, Likan Antaí), Chile
 Awá, Colombia and Ecuador
 Bara, Colombia
 Cara culture, coastal Ecuador, 500 BCE–1550 CE
 Bahía, Ecuador, 500 BCE–500 CE
 Casma culture, coastal Peru, 1000–1400 CE
 Chancay, central coastal Peru, 1000–1450 CE
 Chango, coastal Peru, northern Chile
 Chimú, north coastal Peru, 1000–1450 CE
 Cupisnique (Precolumbian culture), 1000–200 BCE, coastal Peru
 Lambayeque (Sican culture), north coastal Peru, 750–1375 CE
 Machalilla culture, coastal Ecuador, 1500–1100 BCE
 Manteño civilization, western Ecuador, 850–1600 CE
 Moche (Mochica), north coastal Peru, 1–750 CE
 Nazca culture (Nasca), south coastal Peru, 1–700 CE
 Norte Chico civilization (Precolumbian culture), coastal Peru
 Paiján culture, northern coastal Peru, 8,700–5,900 BCE
 Paracas, south coastal Peru, 600–175 BCE
 Recuay culture, Peru (Precolumbian culture)
 Tallán (Precolumbian culture), north coastal Peru
 Valdivia culture, Ecuador, 3500–1800 BCE
 Virú culture, Piura Region, Peru, 200 BCE–300 CE
 Wari culture (Huari culture), Peru, 500–1000 CE
 Yukpa (Yuko), Colombia
 Yurutí, Colombia

Amazon

Northwestern Amazon 
This region includes Amazonas in Brazil; the Amazonas and Putumayo Departments in Colombia; Cotopaxi, Los Rios, Morona-Santiago, Napo, and Pastaza Provinces and the Oriente Region  in Ecuador; and the Loreto Region in Peru.

 Arabela, Loreto Region, Peru
 Arapaso (Arapaco), Amazonas, Brazil
 Baniwa
 Barbudo, Loreto Region, Peru
 Bora,  Loreto Region, Peru
 Candoshi-Shapra (Chapras), Loreto Region, Peru
 Carútana (Arara), Amazonas, Brazil
 Chayahuita (Chaywita) Loreto Region, Peru
 Cocama, Loreto Region, Peru
 Cofán (Cofan), Putumayo Department, Colombia and Ecuador
 Cubeo (Kobeua), Amazonas, Brazil and Colombia
 Dâw, Rio Negro, Brazil
 Flecheiro
 Huaorani (Waorani, Waodani, Waos), Ecuador
 Hupda (Hup), Brazil, Colombia
 Jibito, Loreto Region, Peru
 Jivaroan peoples, Ecuador and Peru
 Achuar, Morona-Santiago Province and Oriente Region, Ecuador and Loreto Region, Peru
 Aguaruna (Aguarana), Ecuador, Peru
 Huambisa, Peru
 Shuar, Morona-Santiago Province and Oriente Region, Ecuador and Loreto Region, Peru
 Kachá (Shimaco, Urarina), Loreto Region, Peru
 Kamsá (Sebondoy), Putumayo Department, Colombia
 Kanamarí, Amazonas, Brazil
 Kichua (Quichua)
 Cañari Kichua (Canari)
 Canelo Kichua (Canelos-Quichua), Pataza Province, Ecuador
 Chimborazo Kichua
 Cholos cuencanos
 Napo Runa (Napo Kichua, Quijos-Quichua, Napo-Quichua), Ecuador and Peru
 Saraguro
 Sarayacu Kichua, Pastaza Province, Ecuador
 Korubu, Amazonas, Brazil
 Kugapakori-Nahua
 Macaguaje (Majaguaje), Río Caquetá, Colombia
 Machiguenga, Peru
 Marubo
 Matsés (Mayoruna, Maxuruna), Brazil and Peru
 Mayoruna (Maxuruna)
 Miriti, Amazonas Department, Colombia
 Murato, Loreto Region, Peru
 Mura, Amazonas, Brazil
 Pirahã (Mura-pirarrã), Amazonas, Brazil
 Nukak (Nukak-Makú), eastern Colombia
 Ocaina, Loreto Region, Peru
 Omagua (Cambeba, Kambeba, Umana), Amazonas, Brazil
 Orejón (Orejon), Napo Province, Ecuador
 Panoan, western Brazil, Bolivia, Peru
 Sharpas
 Siona (Sioni), Amazonas Department, Colombia
 Siriano, Brazil, Colombia
 Siusi, Amazonas, Brazil
 Tariano (Tariana), Amazonas, Brazil
 Tsohom Djapá
 Tukano (Tucano), Brazil, Colombia
 Barasana (Pareroa, Taiwano), Amazonas, Brazil and Vaupés, Colombia
 Eastern Tukanoan (Tucanoan)
 Makuna (Buhagana, Macuna), Amazonas, Brazil and Vaupés, Colombia
 Waikino (Vaikino), Amazonas, Brazil
 Waimiri-Atroari (Kinja, Uaimiri-Atroari), Amazonas and Roraima, Brazil
 Wanano (Unana, Vanana), Amazonas, Brazil
 Witoto
 Murui Witoto,  Loreto Region, Peru
 Yagua (Yahua), Loreta Region, Peru
 Yaminahua (Jaminawa, Yamanawa, Yaminawá), Pando Department, Bolivia
 Yora
 Záparo (Zaparo), Pastaza Province, Ecuador
 Zuruahã (Suruahá, Suruwaha), Amazonas, Brazil

Eastern Amazon 
This region includes Amazonas, Maranhão, and parts of Pará States in Brazil.

 Amanayé (Ararandeura), Brazil
 Araweté (Araueté, Bïde), Pará, Brazil
 Awá (Guajá), Brazil
 Ch'unchu, Peru
 Ge
 Guajajára (Guajajara), Maranhão, Brazil
 Guaraní, Paraguay
 Ka'apor, Maranhão, Brazil
 Kuruaya, Pará, Brazil
 Marajoara, Precolumbian culture, Pará, Brazil
 Panará, Mato Grosso and Pará, Brazil
 Parakanã (Paracana)
 Suruí do Pará, Pará, Brazil
 Tembé
 Turiwára
 Wayampi
 Zo'é people, Pará, Brazil

Southern Amazon 
This region includes southern Brazil (Mato Grosso, Mato Grosso do Sul, parts of Pará, and Rondônia) and Eastern Bolivia (Beni Department).

 Aikanã, Rondônia, Brazil
 Akuntsu, Rondônia, Brazil
 Apiacá (Apiaká), Mato Grosso and Pará, Brazil
 Assuriní do Toncantins (Tocantins)
 Aweti (Aueto), Mato Grosso, Brazil
 Bakairí (Bakairi)
 Chácobo (Chacobo), northwest Beni Department, Bolivia
 Chiquitano (Chiquito, Tarapecosi), Brazil and Santa Cruz, Bolivia
 Cinta Larga, Mato Grosso, Brazil
 Enawene Nawe, Mato Grosso, Brazil
 Gavião of Rondônia
 Guarayu (Guarayo), Bolivia
 Ikpeng (Xicao), Mato Grosso, Brazil
 Itene, Beni Department, Bolivia
 Irántxe (Iranche)
 Juma (Kagwahiva), Rondônia, Brazil
 Jurúna (Yaruna, Juruna, Yudjá), Mato Grosso, Brazil
 Kaiabi (Caiabi, Cajabi, Kajabi, Kayabi), Mato Grosso, Brazil
 Kalapálo (Kalapalo), Mato Grosso, Brazil
 Kamayurá (Camayura), Mato Grosso, Brazil
 Kanoê (Kapixaná), Rondônia, Brazil
 Karipuná (Caripuna)
 Karitiâna (Caritiana), Brazil
 Kayapo, Mato Grosso, Brazil
 Kuikuro, Mato Grosso, Brazil
 Matipu, Mato Grosso, Brazil
 Mehináku (Mehinacu, Mehinako), Mato Grosso, Brazil
 Moxo (Mojo), Bolivia
 Nahukuá (Nahuqua), Mato Grosso, Brazil
 Nambikuára (Nambicuara, Nambikwara), Mato Grosso, Brazil
 Pacahuara (Pacaguara, Pacawara), northwest Beni Department, Bolivia
 Pacajá (Pacaja)
 Panará, Mato Grosso and Pará, Brazil
 Parecís (Paressi)
 Rikbaktsa (Erikbaksa), Mato Grosso, Brazil
 Rio Pardo people, Mato Grosso, Brazil
 Sateré-Mawé (Maue), Brazil
 Suyá (Kisedje), Mato Grosso, Brazil
 Tacana (Takana), Beni and Madre de Dios Rivers, Bolivia
 Tapajó (Tapajo)
 Tenharim
 Trumai, Mato Grosso, Brazil
 Tsimané (Chimané, Mosetén, Pano), Beni Department, Bolivia
 Uru-Eu-Wau-Wau, Rondônia, Brazil
 Wari' (Pacanawa, Waricaca'), Rondônia, Brazil
 Wauja (Waurá, Waura), Mato Grosso, Brazil
 Wuy jugu (Mundurucu, Munduruku)
 Yawalapiti (Iaualapiti), Mato Grosso, Brazil

Southwestern Amazon 
This region includes the Cuzco, Huánuco Junín, Loreto, Madre de Dios, and Ucayali Regions of eastern Peru, parts of Acre, Amazonas, and Rondônia, Brazil, and parts of the La Paz and Beni Departments of Bolivia.

 Aguano (Santacrucino, Uguano), Peru
 Amahuaca, Brazil, Peru
 Apurinã (Popũkare), Amazonas and Acre
 Asháninka (Campa, Chuncha), Acre, Brazil and Junín, Pasco, Huánuco, and Ucayali, Peru
 Banawá (Jafí, Kitiya), Amazonas, Brazil
 Cashibo (Carapache), Huánuco Region, Peru
 Conibo (Shipibo-Conibo), Peru and Amazonas, Brazil
 Ese Ejja (Chama), Beni Department, Bolivia
 Harakmbut, Madre de Dios, Peru
 Amarakaeri, Madre de Dios Region, Peru
 Kareneri, Madre de Dios Region, Peru
 Huachipaeri, Madre de Dios Region, Peru
 Arasairi, Madre de Dios Region, Peru
 Manuquiari, Madre de Dios Region, Peru
 Puikiri (Puncuri), Madre de Dios Region, Peru
 Sapiteri, Madre de Dios Region, Peru
 Toyeri, Madre de Dios Region, Peru
 Hi-Merimã, Himarimã, Amazonas, Brazil
 Jamamadi, Acre and Amazonas, Brazil
 Kaxinawá (Cashinahua, Huni Kuin), Peru and Acre, Brazil
 Kulina (Culina), Peru
 Kwaza (Coaiá, Koaiá), Rondônia, Brazil
 Latundê, Rondônia, Brazil
 Machinere, Bolivia and Peru
 Mashco-Piro, Peru
 Matís (Matis), Brazil
 Matsés (Mayoruna, Maxuruna), Brazil, Peru
 Parintintin (Kagwahiva’nga), Brazil
 Shipibo, Loreto Region, Peru
 Sirionó (Chori, Miá), Beni and Santa Cruz Departments, Bolivia
 Ticuna (Tucuna), Brazil, Colombia, Peru
 Toromono (Toromona), La Paz Department, Bolivia
 Yanesha' (Amuesha), Cusco Region, Peru
 Yawanawa (Jaminawá, Marinawá, Xixinawá), Acre, Brazil; Madre de Dios, Peru; and Bolivia
 Yine (Contaquiro, Simiranch, Simirinche), Cuzco Region, Peru
 Yuqui (Bia, Yuki), Cochabamba Department, Bolivia
 Yuracaré (Yura), Beni and Cochabamba Departments, Bolivia

Gran Chaco 

 Abipón, Argentina, historic group
 Angaite (Angate), northwestern Paraguay
 Ayoreo (Ayoré, Moro, Morotoco, Pyeta, Yovia, Zamuco), Bolivia and Paraguay
 Chamacoco (Zamuko), Paraguay
 Chané, Argentina and Bolivia
 Chiquitano (Chiquito, Tarapecosi), eastern Bolivia
 Chorote (Choroti, Iyo'wujwa, Iyojwa'ja Chorote, Manjuy), Argentina, Bolivia, and Paraguay
 Guana (Kaskihá), Paraguay
 Guaraní, Argentina, Bolivia, Brazil, and Paraguay
 Bolivian Guaraní
 Chiriguano, Bolivia
 Guarayo (East Bolivian Guaraní)
 Chiripá (Tsiripá, Ava), Bolivia
 Pai Tavytera (Pai, Montese, Ava), Bolivia
 Tapieté (Guaraní Ñandéva, Yanaigua), eastern Bolivia
 Yuqui (Bia), Bolivia
 Guaycuru peoples, Argentina, Bolivia, Brazil, and Paraguay
 Mbayá (Caduveo), historic
 Kadiweu, Brazil
 Mocoví (Mocobí), Argentina
 Pilagá (Pilage Toba)
 Toba (Qom, Frentones), Argentina, Bolivia, and Paraguay
 Kaiwá, Argentina and Brazil
 Lengua people (Enxet), Paraguay
 North Lengua (Eenthlit, Enlhet, Maskoy), Paraguay
 South Lengua, Paraguay
 Lulé (Pelé, Tonocoté), Argentina
 Maká (Towolhi), Paraguay
 Nivaclé (Ashlushlay, Chulupí, Chulupe, Guentusé), Argentina and Paraguay
 Sanapaná (Quiativis), Paraguay
 Vilela, Argentina
 Wichí (Mataco), Argentina and Tarija Department, Bolivia

Southern Cone 

 Aché, southeastern Paraguay
 Chaná (extinct), formerly Uruguay
 Chandule (Chandri)
 Charrúa, southern Brazil and Uruguay
 Comechingon (Henia-Camiare), Argentina
 Haush (Manek'enk, Mánekenk, Aush), Tierra del Fuego
 Het (Querandí) (extinct), formerly Argentinian Pampas
 Chechehet
 Didiuhet
 Taluhet
 Huarpe (Warpes), Argentina, Chile
 Allentiac (Alyentiyak)
 Millcayac (Milykayak)
 Oico
 Chiquillanes
 Pehuenche (later Araucanized)
 Mapuche (Araucanian), southwestern Argentina and Chile
 Huilliche (Huillice, Hulliche, Güilliche), Chile
 Cunco
 Veliche
 Lafquenche
 Mapuche, southwestern Argentina and Chile
 Pehuenche, south central Chile and Argentina
 Picunche, formerly Chile
 Promaucae, formerly Chile
 Mbeguá (extinct), formerly Paraná River, Argentina
 Minuane (extinct), formerly Uruguay
 Puelche (Guennaken, Pamba) (extinct), Argentinian and Chilean Andes
 Tehuelche, Patagonia
 Künün-a-Güna (Gennakenk, Gennaken)
 Küwach-a-Güna
 Mecharnúekenk
 Aónikenk (Zuidelijke Tehuelche)
 Teushen (Tehues), extinct, formerly Tierra del Fuego
 Selk'nam (Ona), Tierra del Fuego
 Yaro (Jaro)

Fjords and channels of Patagonia
 Alacaluf (Kaweshkar, Halakwulup), Chile
 Chono (Guaiteco), formerly Chiloé Archipelago, Chile
 Yaghan (Yamana), Tierra del Fuego
 Caucahue (poorly known, possibly a partiality of Kaweshkar or Chono)

Languages 

Indigenous languages of the Americas (or Amerindian Languages) are spoken by Indigenous peoples from the southern tip of South America to Alaska and Greenland, encompassing the land masses which constitute the Americas. These Indigenous languages consist of dozens of distinct language families as well as many language isolates and unclassified languages. Many proposals to group these into higher-level families have been made. According to UNESCO, most of the Indigenous American languages in North America are critically endangered and many of them are already extinct.

Genetic classification 

The haplogroup most commonly associated with Indigenous Americans is Haplogroup Q1a3a (Y-DNA). Y-DNA, like (mtDNA), differs from other nuclear chromosomes in that the majority of the Y chromosome is unique and does not recombine during meiosis. This has the effect that the historical pattern of mutations can easily be studied. The pattern indicates Indigenous peoples of the Americas experienced two very distinctive genetic episodes; first with the initial-peopling of the Americas, and secondly with European colonization of the Americas. The former is the determinant factor for the number of gene lineages and founding haplotypes present in today's Indigenous American populations.

Human settlement of the Americas occurred in stages from the Bering sea coast line, with an initial 20,000-year layover on Beringia for the founding population. The micro-satellite diversity and distributions of the Y lineage specific to South America indicates that certain Amerindian populations have been isolated since the initial colonization of the region. The Na-Dené, Inuit and Indigenous Alaskan populations exhibit haplogroup Q (Y-DNA) mutations, however are distinct from other Indigenous Americans with various mtDNA mutations. This suggests that the earliest migrants into the northern extremes of North America and Greenland derived from later populations.

See also 
 Classification of indigenous languages of the Americas
 Indigenous languages of the Americas
 List of pre-Columbian cultures
 List of traditional territories of the indigenous peoples of North America
 Population history of Indigenous peoples of the Americas
 Smithsonian Handbook of South American Indians

Notes

References 

 D'Azevedo, Warren L., volume editor. Handbook of North American Indians, Volume 11: Great Basin. Washington, DC: Smithsonian Institution, 1986. .
 Hann, John H. "The Mayaca and Jororo and Missions to Them", in McEwan, Bonnie G. ed. The Spanish Missions of "La Florida". Gainesville, Florida: University Press of Florida. 1993. .
 Hann, John H. A History of the Timucua Indians and Missions. Gainesville, Florida: University Press of Florida, 1996. .
 Hann, John H. (2003). Indians of Central and South Florida: 1513–1763. University Press of Florida. .
 Heizer, Robert F., volume editor. Handbook of North American Indians, Volume 8: California. Washington, DC: Smithsonian Institution, 1978. .
 
 Pritzker, Barry M. A Native American Encyclopedia: History, Culture, and Peoples. Oxford: Oxford University Press, 2000. .
 Steward, Julian H., editor. Handbook of South American Indians, Volume 4: The Circum-Caribbean Tribes. Smithsonian Institution, 1948.
 Sturtevant, William C., general editor and Bruce G. Trigger, volume editor. Handbook of North American Indians: Northeast. Volume 15. Washington DC: Smithsonian Institution, 1978. .
 Sturtevant, William C., general editor and Raymond D. Fogelson, volume editor. Handbook of North American Indians: Southeast. Volume 14. Washington DC: Smithsonian Institution, 2004. .

Classification of people
History of indigenous peoples of the Americas
Indigenous peoples of the Americas
Indigenous languages of the Americas
Lists of indigenous peoples of the Americas